Piresia is a genus of South American plants in the grass family.

Species
 Piresia goeldii Swallen - French Guiana, Suriname, Venezuela (Amazonas), Colombia (Amazonas), Ecuador, Peru (Loreto), Brazil (Pará, Amazonas, Rondônia)
 Piresia leptophylla Soderstr. - Colombia (Amazonas), Ecuador, Peru, Brazil(Pernambuco, Amazonas, Bahia), Trinidad & Tobago
 Piresia macrophylla Soderstr. - French Guiana, Peru (San Martín, Loreto), Brazil (Amazonas, Rondônia, Acre)
 Piresia palmula M.L.S.Carvalho & R.P.Oliveira - Brazil (Bahia)
 Piresia sympodica (Döll) Swallen - Venezuela, French Guiana, Suriname, Guyana, Colombia, Ecuador, Peru, Brazil, Trinidad & Tobago

References

Bambusoideae genera
Grasses of South America
Flora of the Amazon
Grasses of Brazil
Bambusoideae